The Midlands Conference was an intercollegiate athletic conference that existed from 1947 to 1952. Its members were located in the states of Illinois, Iowa, and Wisconsin.

Football champions

1947 – Loras
1948 – Loras

1949 – St. Ambrose
1950 – St. Norbert

1951 – Lewis (IL)
1952 – St. Norbert

See also
List of defunct college football conferences

References

Defunct college sports conferences in the United States
College sports in Illinois
College sports in Iowa
College sports in Wisconsin